Sovereign Communications, LLC is an American radio broadcasting company which owns 17 radio stations in the Upper Peninsula of Michigan, with offices in Sault Ste. Marie, Michigan. The company is owned and operated by William C. Gleich and Tim Sabean.

After their February 2010 purchase of 11 stations from Northern Star Broadcasting, the company holds "something close to a local monopoly" on radio stations in the Sault Ste. Marie region. The transaction was publicly valued at $3,425,000 in cash. Several Northern Star employees (both on-air and in management) lost their jobs as a result of the purchase. As well, 97.9 WIHC out of Newberry, Michigan went dark that same month after not being purchased from Northern Star in the deal, only returning two years later under new ownership. At present, Sovereign Communications owns every locally produced, non-simulcasted FM station in the Sault Ste. Marie, Michigan market, except for the two classic hits stations owned by Darby Advertising under their "Radio Eagle" format (WUPN & WMJT).

In May 2007, the company started the WSOO Scholarship, available to a student at Lake Superior State University with a "demonstrated interest and involvement in communication". To qualify for the scholarship, the student must be a resident of the eastern Upper Peninsula of Michigan, and preference is given to applicants who graduated from a Chippewa County high school. The WSOO scholarship covers "full tuition and required fees" at the university for one year.

Radio stations

Sault Ste. Marie, MI 
1230 WSOO  Full service
1400 WKNW  ESPN/Sports
99.5 WYSS  Contemporary Hits
101.3 WSUE  Rock
105.5 WMKD  Country

Marquette, MI 
1320 WDMJ News/Talk
92.3 WJPD Country
94.1 WUPK Rock
99.5 WNGE Oldies

Iron Mountain, MI 
1450 WMIQ  Talk
93.1 WIMK   Rock
94.3 WZNL    Hot Adult Contemporary

Newberry, MI 
1450 WNBY Classic Country
93.9 WNBY-FM  Classic Hits

References

Radio broadcasting companies of the United States
Companies based in Michigan